Angu Mashoko is Ngonie's second studio album. Released and launched on 20 October (a day after Ngonie turned 21) at Cheers Night Club in Mabvuku, it is a 13-track album with 12 original tracks and one radio mix. Ngonie funded the whole production of this album on his own and released it on his own label 4RoomsOfLove, Highway Entertainment.

Track listing
 Shamwari (5.00) features Alexio Kawara
 Angela (5.39)
 Tsika (5.02)
 Nherera (4.44) features Diana Samkwange
 Dekadzo (4.11)
 Rudo neChido (5.04)
 Mazakwatira (3.49) with Leonard Mapuranga
 Pedyo Newe (6.02)
 Kuswera Newe (4.28)
 Jabulani (3.44) featuring Carmelita
 Shoko (4.38)
 Kundivenga (3.43)
 Zunza (Radio edit of Mazakwatira) (3.30)

Chart performance

Shamwari and Angela achieved the PowerFM top 100 status for the year 2006

Album sales

Record Labels and/or music distribution companies in Zimbabwe do not release details of the sales of their artistes and so it is difficult to tell the extent to which the album was sold. However, the Zimbabwean Herald newspaper publishes a weekly poll of the sales performance for each of the main music companies in that country. According to some of these reports, sales of this album were quite good for a number of weeks at least.

Music videos

A video was produced for the track "Angela". The video aired on the local ZTV station and was also distributed to most banking halls where it was also played.

References

Other sources
 Angu Mashoko CD - CD-TP-NK2/2 (p) 2004 @ Metro

Ngonie albums
2004 albums
Shona-language albums